Habloville is a commune in the Orne department in north-western France. The inhabitants of Habloville,are called Hablovillais and Hablovillaises

Geography

The commune of Habloville borders Suisse Normande to the north, south and west and on its eastern border the communes of Ri and Rônai. 

The commune is made up of the following collection of villages and hamlets, Habloville, Launay Percot, Bissey and Noirville.  

The source of the River La Baize is located at the Villages Lavoir opposite the church.

History

Neolithic period

Habloville contains evidence of Neolithic presence in the area with a dolmen or stone table measuring 3.25 meters by 2.95 meters called the Dolmen des Bignes. 

The Dolmen is situated just North of another Neolithic site, this time a Tumulus, in Habloville called the Tumulus des Hogues which was listed as a historical monument in 1968.

Roman

The village Ablo-Villa, literally the domain of Hablon, was probably born in the Gallo-Roman era. Venus was worshiped near the Pirouet spring where two Tanagra figurines were found, and now stored in the National Archaeological Museum of France in Saint-Germain-en-Laye.

Middle Ages

In the Middle Ages the village experienced a certain prosperity as it is on a  pilgrimage route to Mont-Saint-Michel and Santiago de Compostela.

15th to 19th Centaury

An area of Habloville, the stronghold of Noirville was purchased by the Fouasse familyin the 15th centuary, who took on the name, to become the Fouasse de Noirville Marquis. They owned the area until 1789 after an uprising of the local peasants.    

Near the end of the 18th century, a Chappe telegraph was built in Habloville near the Château du Jardin in Bissey. On May 29, 1799, a small group of Chouans surrounded by 3,000 Republican soldiers fell back towards the telegraph, defended only by its employees. They were savagely murdered and the square tower supporting the great arms set on fire. After its reconstruction in 1800, the telegraph will operate until the early 1850s.

Lime kilns were built between the areas of Monts and Noirville in the 18th century and used up until the 19th century.  The Kilns were in use until 1870 when they were shutdown due to the use of chemical fertilizers in agriculture and of cement in construction.

20th Centuary

Habloville was liberated from the Germans on the 18 August 1944.  The 10th SS Panzer Division Frundsberg defended the village against the Allied forces to hold an opening for the encircled German forces in the Falaise pocket. In the hurry to flee the offensive, the Germans left many items behind, including the 10.5 cm leFH 18 Howitzer that is now displayed next to the war memorial.

Notable Buildings & places

Church of Our Lady of the Nativity is a Church built during the 13th to 15th Century and the interior is classed as a Monument historique. It contains treasure of sacred art and furniture dating from the 15th to 18th Centaury.

Dolmen des Bignes - Neolithic Dolmen

Tumulus des Hogues - Neolithic site

Villages Lavoir - source of La Baize

Population

See also
 Communes of the Orne department

References

Communes of Orne